Frequent urination, or urinary frequency (sometimes called pollakiuria), is the need to urinate more often than usual. Diuretics are medications that increase urinary frequency. Nocturia is the need of frequent urination at night. The most common cause of this condition for women and children is a urinary tract infection. The most common cause of urinary frequency in older men is an enlarged prostate.

Frequent urination is strongly associated with frequent incidents of urinary urgency, which is the sudden need to urinate.  It is often, though not necessarily, associated with urinary incontinence and polyuria (large total volume of urine). However, in other cases, urinary frequency involves only normal volumes of urine overall.

Definition 
The normal number of times varies according to the age of the person. Among young children, urinating 8 to 14 times each day is typical. This decreases to 6–12 times per day for older children, and to 4–6 times per day among teenagers.

Causes 
The most common causes of frequent urination are:
 interstitial cystitis
 urinary tract infection
 enlarged prostate
 urethral inflammation or infection
 vaginal inflammation or infection.
Less common causes of frequent urination are:
 alcoholism
 anxiety
 bladder cancer
 caffeine
 diabetes
 pregnancy
 psychiatric medications such as clozapine
 radiation therapy to the pelvis
 brain or nervous system diseases
 stroke
 tumor in the pelvis
 kidney stones.

Diagnosis and treatment
Diagnosis of the underlying cause requires a careful and thorough evaluation.

Treatment depends on the underlying cause or condition.

See also
 Polyuria
 Nocturnal enuresis

References

External links 

Urinary incontinence
Symptoms and signs: Urinary system
Urology